Emily Elizabeth Shaw Beavan (1818-6 August 1897), was an Irish born 19th-century poet and story writer who lived in Canada, England and Australia.

Early life and education
Born Emily Elizabeth Shaw in 1818 in Belfast, Ireland, she was the daughter of Samuel Shaw, a Master Mariner, and Isabella Adelaide McMorran. Her father sailed between Canada and Ireland regularly. She emigrated with her family, including at least two sisters and two brothers, to New Brunswick in 1836. She continued her education there and gained her teacher's licence in King's County on 18 September 1837. She was teaching in Norton at the time.

She married Frederick Williams Cadwalleder Beavan on 19 June 1838 in Sussex Vale, Kings County,. Her husband was the local surgeon and teacher and they lived initially in Long Creek, New Brunswick. Later they moved to Mount Auburn, English Settlement. There Beavan contributed stories and poems to the newly established paper, Amaranth. While she didn't use a pen name, she wrote under the common practice of dashing out letters from the name, Mrs B----n or Emily B----n.

In 1842 Beavan requested a teacher's licence for Queens County. However, in 1843 the family migrated to England where her husband's father had died allowing her husband to take up his position as surgeon at the Derwent Mines in Blanchland, Northumberland. Her first book, Sketches and tales illustrative of life in the backwoods of New Brunswick, North America, was published while she was living in England in 1845.

They did not remain long in England, in 1852 the family moved again to live in Kilmore, Melbourne. There Beavan wrote for Eliza Cook's Journal and various local newspapers. Her husband died in 1867 and Beavan moved to live with her son in Sydney in 1881 where she died on 6 August 1897. While she was buried in an unmarked grave at Rookwood Cemetery, memorial was put on her husband's grave in Kilmore General Cemetery.

Bibliography
 Sketches and tales illustrative of life in the backwoods of New Brunswick, North America, 1845

Poems 
 Song Of The Irish Mourner
 The Mother's Prayer
 On Prayer
 The Mignonette
 A Vision

Short Stories 
 The Lost One
 Adelaide Belmore
 Recollections of Tombe St
 Edith Melborne
 A Tale of New Brunswick
 Madeline St. Clair
 Story of Deara, Princess Meath
 A Tale of Intemperance
 The Enthusiast
 Lines (The Lost Children)

References and sources

1818 births
1897 deaths
19th-century Irish women writers
19th-century Canadian women writers
19th-century Irish poets
19th-century Canadian poets